Maybe This Time is a 2014 Filipino romantic comedy film directed by Jerry Lopez Sineneng starring Sarah Geronimo and Coco Martin. The film, produced by Star Cinema and Viva Films and distributed by the former, officially premiered in the Philippines on May 28, 2014.

The film, which was labelled as 2014's summer movie Valentine, was the first team-up of Geronimo and Martin on the big screen after having previously worked together in the TV series 1DOL. It earned  on the first day of its release.

Synopsis
Steph Asuncion (Sarah Geronimo) and Tonio Bugayong (Coco Martin) were once in love. Back then, she was a young girl who wanted a simple life and he was older, more ambitious than she was. Tonio was a small town guy who wants to board a ship to provide for his family’s furniture business. Steph was a Manila girl who spends the summer in the province for community service. What might have been a sweet relationship ended sourly when Tonio left without saying goodbye. Steph was heartbroken and it taught her to dream bigger to be worthy of love. Will their paths cross again? Will they overcome the pains of the past to give love a second chance? This is a story between two people who will be reminded about the importance of being true to one’s self in order for true love to happen.

Cast and  Characters

Main
Sarah Geronimo as Stephanie "Steph"/ "Teptep" Asuncion
Coco Martin as Antonio "Tonio" Bugayong
Ruffa Gutierrez as Monica T. Valencia

Supporting
Ogie Diaz as Mae
Dennis Padilla as Erning
Shamaine Buencamino as Lenny
Buboy Garovillo as Butch
Marlann Flores as Mels
Zeppi Borromeo as Jans
Kathleen Hermosa as Clara
Alex Castro as Patrick
Devon Seron as Abby
Marco Masa as Danno
Bea Basa as Porky
Sofia Millares as Kimberly
Aaron Junatas as Hyro
Minnie Aguilar as Elma
Dante Ponce as Andrew
Marina Benipayo as Carmen
Cecil Paz as Susan
Tony Mabesa as Pancho

Development

Casting and production
Originally, Martin was supposed to star with Marian Rivera in a movie also entitled Maybe This Time. The film was supposed to have been helmed by Maryo J. de los Reyes and produced by Regal Films for an early-2013 release. The film likewise would have co-starred Snooky Serna as Martin's mother and was touted as bringing together talents from both ABS-CBN and GMA. The movie, however, was ultimately shelved.

The announcement of the main casts for the film was made on February 8, 2014. The details were first discussed through a meeting on January 21, 2014. At the time, although there were no official announcements for the movie yet, it was already publicized that Geronimo and Martin will be the leads, together with Ruffa Gutierrez, and will be directed by Jerry Lopez Sineneng.

Promotions
On March 1, 2014, the official theme song of the movie accompanied by a music video was released. The film's theme "Maybe This Time" by Michael Martin Murphey was covered by the film's lead, Sarah Geronimo. The whole team held a grand press conference on May 15, 2014, at the Dolphy Theater to talk about the film and their experiences. The next day, the first official full-length trailer was released on YouTube.

References

External links
 
 

2014 films
Star Cinema films
Viva Films films
2010s Tagalog-language films
2010s English-language films
2014 romantic comedy films
Philippine romantic comedy films
Films directed by Jerry Lopez Sineneng